Phạm Văn Đổng (October 25, 1919 – November 26, 2008) was a South Vietnamese general. In 1965, as military governor of Saigon, he had successfully repressed Buddhist mobs instigated by Thích Trí Quang of the Ấn Quang group and Thích Tâm Châu of Việt Nam Quốc Tự. With his commanding skills and knowledge, Đổng was regarded highly by American and French officers, and well respected by many ARVN officers. A staunch nationalist and anti-communist, he was considered an ally to the labor union, the Northern Catholics, several Việt Nam Quốc Dân Đảng (Việt Quốc) factions, multiple Đại Việt groups, Việt Nam Cách Mạng Đồng Minh Hội (Việt Cách) high-ranking members, Duy Dân and Hòa Hảo leaders.

Early life and education

Phạm Văn Đổng was born October 25, 1919, in Quốc Oai district, Sơn Tây, Tonkin (now North Vietnam), when Vietnam was still part of French Indochina.  He grew up in his father's village of Xuân Đỗ, Gia Lâm district (then part of Bắc Ninh Province) and went to school in Hà Nội where he earned the "Thành Chung" (Diplôme d'Etudes Primaires Superieures Indochinoises (DEPSI)) upon his graduation from Đỗ Hữu Vị School.

Generations of Đổng's family had taught at the Imperial Court. Phạm Văn Đổng himself had planned to become a teacher, so he enrolled at the École Normale d'Instituteurs. In 1939, he had to withdraw, as he did not have the money to bribe a court official, even though he had passed the required examinations. He then joined the French colonial army at the persuasion of his father's friend. It was a good decision as Đồng would later become one of the first Vietnamese officers to command French soldiers at the light division level (Groupement Mobile). Đổng was also one of the few ARVN officers to have been officers in the French Army and the only general officer who had begun his military career as a private.
Ref:External links News of his death-

Career summary

World War II

Five years after joining the army as an enlisted man, he was promoted to Officer of Materials for the 2nd Battalion of the 19th Colonial Infantry Regiment (Officier du Matériel, II/19e RMIC) stationed in Móng Cái. Here, he earned the trust of young Nùng, many of whom he later trained to be competent officers of the ARVN.

On March 9, 1945, as part of their coup d'état in French Indochina, Imperial Japanese Army forces in Tonkin attacked two battalions of the 19ème RMIC at Hà Cối. Two days later, the regiment commanding officer, Lieutenant Colonel Charles LeCocq, was killed in action while leading a counter-attack. His body would have been left behind were it not for the sharp-shooter Hoang Duc Phung who recovered it with Đổng's mortar support.

Two weeks later, Đổng and remnants of the 1er Territoire Militaire  fought their way to Quảng Tây in South China where they joined General Marcel Alessandri who had been cooperating with the Chinese National Kuomintang Army (國民革命軍) in the fight against Japanese armies. There, Đổng attended a special officer class.  During this period, he secretly made contacts with several Việt Quốc revolutionaries-in-exile most of whom would become his good friends and ardent supporters throughout his career in South Vietnam.  At the end of 1945, Sous Lieutenant Đổng returned to Vietnam where he was assigned to Vạn Hoa.

The First Indochina War

In 1946, Đổng was transferred to the south where he participated in several major operations in Gò Công, Long Thành, and Thành Tuy Hạ.  A year later, his successes against communist troops earned him a promotion to  lieutenant. His abilities in organizing intelligence networks eventually landed him a position working for the Governor of North Vietnam, Nghiêm Xuân Thiện as Sous-Directeur des Etudes (Phó Sở Nghiên Cứu) where he reported to Captain Sylvain Trần Văn Minh.

In 1949, Lieutenant Đổng went back to the army as Chief of S-2 for the 2e BVN (Trưởng Phòng 2 của Bộ chỉ huy TĐ2 VN). In 1950, the State of Vietnam's Minister of Defense Phan Huy Quát, a Đại Việt leader, asked Đổng to join the Vietnamese National Army. A year later, after participating in the battle of Vĩnh Yên, he was appointed Commandant of the South Zone based in Nam Định.

Early 1952, Captain Đổng was appointed Commander of the 55th Vietnamese Battalion (55e BVN) stationed at the Nà Sản fire-base.  In late November, using 3 battle-hardened divisions (308th, 316th and 320th) General Giap attacked Nà Sản with the intention of defeating the French Union forces to take control of northwest Tonkin.  The 55e BVN fought valiantly against the enemy's relentless assaults.  To put an end to the "human wave", Đổng ordered his artillery-support to level and to fire howitzers loaded with fragmentation shells directly at the enemy troops.  His decision saved the battalion and earned him a promotion to Major.

By the end of the year, he took command of the 2e Groupe Mobile that participated in some of the hardest-fought battles to pacify the Red River Delta, especially in the Ninh Bình area during Operation Hautes Alpes in March 1953. In September 1953, he was appointed Commander of the Bùi Chu Secteur and concurrently Commander of the Forces of North Vietnam Light Battalions and Artillery. The latter position was very important, for he was in command of nineteen light infantry battalions (TĐKQ) and three artillery companies with the mission to pacify a military zone comprising seven provinces.

Prior to taking command of Bùi Chu, Đổng participated in Operation Tarentaise to take back areas under the Việt Minh's control.  In October 1953, he commanded Operation Lê Lợi to attack enemy's strongholds in the area. The operation was successful, though the cost was high: one of Đổng light battalions at Quần Phương Hạ was completely destroyed by the Việt Minh's more seasoned independent regiments.

It was in Bùi Chu that Đổng, a Buddhist, would become an ally of Bishop Phạm Ngọc Chi, his diocese and Father Hoàng Quỳnh. In return, these Roman Catholics would become his staunch supporters in both North and South Vietnam.

In mid-1954, he was sent to South Korea to attend a special military training.  Coming back to Vietnam shortly after the Geneva Convention that had partitioned the country into two,  Đổng as Commander of the Quảng Yên Military Academy redeployed the academy resources and its personnel southward during Operation Passage to Freedom.

Vietnam War

From 1954 to the end of the 1st Republic
Đổng had done well as a military man.  He had been recognized as a capable tactician by his superiors who continuously promoted him in the first 14 years of his military career.  From a humble beginning as a plain soldier in 1939, he had steadily climbed the military ladder to the position of Lieutenant Colonel at the end of the First Indochina War.

After the partition of Vietnam into two countries, Head-of-State Bảo Đại brought his government south where power struggles among different groups would lead to a change in the country's political future.  Early 1955, Prime Minister Ngô Đình Diệm consolidated his power over South Vietnam by forcing General Hinh to leave the country then by using the armed forces to defeat the Bình Xuyên, Hòa Hảo and Cao Đài forces. Then, in a rigged referendum on October 23, 1955, Diệm ousted Bảo Đại and founded the Republic. During this time, Đổng was the Coastal Zone Commander (Liên Khu Duyên Hải).  After the referendum, Diệm celebrated his rise to power by promoting all senior officers.  Even though he supported General Hinh, Đổng was promoted to colonel. He would remain in charge of the coastal zone until October 25, 1956 when President Diệm transferred him to Sông Mao (Bình Thuận) to command the 3rd Field Division, a unit made up entirely of Nùng soldiers. Lieutenant Colonel Đỗ Mậu, Đổng second-in-command who was Diệm's protégé and a Cần Lao party member, was promoted to replace him. Ironically, Mậu later would betray Diệm in 1963.

Colonel Đổng attracted Diệm's attention by refusing to let Cần Lao's cadres conduct political training sessions for his troops.  Moreover, he also befriended and sheltered remnants of the Bình Xuyên and Hòa Hảo's defeated forces.

In March 1958, President Diệm seeing that the 3rd Field Division was loyal to none but Colonel Đổng, transferred Nùng soldiers to other units within the Army. In 1959, some of the Nùng soldiers left the army to join Father Nguyễn Lạc Hoá, a good friend of Đổng and a fervent anti-communist priest at the newly formed Sea Swallows enclave in Cà Mau.  Đổng, who was self-taught in English, was sent to training at the United States Army Command and General Staff College in Fort Leavenworth, Kansas.

When Đổng returned to Vietnam in 1959, he was appointed Deputy Commander of the III Corps. In this position, he was in charge of conducting campaigns against NVA and Viet Cong units within the Corps's territory.  During this period, he was not killed as President Diệm had hoped.  Instead, due to his bravery, Đổng earned the loyalty of his new troops and the respect of many junior officers which caused Diệm to mistrust him even more.  The Ngô Đình's family personally disliked the colonel because of his friendship with Western reporters who had been writing articles damaging to the country's cause and unity (such as Neil Sheehan, David Halberstam, Malcolm Browne, François Sully, Robert Shaplen, Peter Arnett, and Beverly Deepe). In December 1962, after an American general had advised Diệm to promote Đổng to general and after hearing other American advisers praised the colonel for his commanding skills, the president demoted Đổng to III Corps's Inspector General of Strategic Hamlets.

In August 1963, Buddhist monks caused a political disturbance, commonly known as the Buddhist crisis. This turmoil led to the November 1st coup d'état that toppled Diệm's government. Shortly before the coup, President Diệm had the colonel held at Camp Lê Văn Duyệt out of suspicion that the latter was preparing to launch a coup to topple the government.  Đổng was indeed one of the conspirators and his detention shifted the President's suspicion away from other senior officers, primarily General Đôn, head of a CIA-backed and funded group of plotters (CIA liaison officer Lucien Conein gave this group US$42,000).  On November 2,  General Dương Văn "Big" Minh, a Diệm's protégé, ordered his bodyguard Captain Nguyễn Văn Nhung and Major Dương Hiếu Nghĩa to torture and to kill the brothers Ngô Đình.  Most Vietnamese senior officers suspected that general Minh took US Ambassador Lodge's suggestion of eliminating the brothers "to prevent any colonel from bring them back to power".

Several ARVN generals then assumed leadership of South Vietnam.  Power struggles, some of which influenced by the monk Trí Quang, would lead to a period of instability in the whole country.  Political stability only came in 1967 when Lieutenant General Nguyễn Văn Thiệu and Air Marshal Nguyễn Cao Kỳ were elected leaders of the 2nd Republic.

The turbulent years (1964–1967)
With the escalation of the Vietnam War and with the increased United States involvement, the role of the ARVN became more significant but was seen by the media in the West as insignificant.  After the coup, Colonel Đổng served briefly as 7th Infantry Division Commander, during which time he earned the alias "Tiger of the Delta" for his twelve successful operations against Viet Cong and NVA troops.  Late December 1963, he was abruptly relieved command of the division and was sent to Taiwan as military attaché.

Returning from Taiwan in May 1964, he was promoted to brigadier general by General Nguyễn Khánh. Late October 1964, he was promoted to major general.  A month later on November 27, he was appointed military governor of Saigon (now Ho Chi Minh City) and concurrently as Special Capital Military District Commander (Tư Lệnh Biệt Khu Thủ đô). During this time, Đổng formed and funded his own armed group made up almost entirely of Nùng soldiers.

Being charged with keeping the capital safe in these troubled times, he had to deal with an enemy in South Vietnam, the Buddhist Struggle Movement led by two monks, Thích Trí Quang of the Ấn Quang group and  Thích Tâm Châu of Việt Nam Quốc Tự (VNQT).   Both of these monks wanted to topple the government of Vietnam, or at least to render it ineffective.  Prime Minister Trần Văn Hương, a Buddhist, took a firm stand against the movement to prevent the country from anarchy.  During this turmoil, PM Hương fully supported General Đổng when the latter effectively handled Buddhist protests and street agitations.  Arrests were limited but well chosen and almost of detainees were proven to be Communists agents within the  Ấn Quang group.  At one time, Đổng deployed two battalions to disband a violent and armed mob from VNQT.  Tâm Châu stopped his anti-government activities after a meeting with General Nguyễn Khánh, while  Trí Quang continued to cause political unrest.  Recent declassified CIA documents suggest that the Buddhist movement had been penetrated by Viet Cong agents.  Tâm Châu himself published a White Paper in 1993 accusing Trí Quang of being a power-hunger man manipulated by North Vietnam and of harboring Communist agents. A declassified French Sûreté report showed that Trí Quang joined the Indochinese Communist Party in 1949, a fact that former SRV Deputy Prime Minister Tố Hữu proudly confirmed in 2000.

In January 1965,  Trí Quang successfully pressured Head-of-State Nguyễn Khánh into dismissing P.M. Hương. A month later, Dr. Quát, a devout Buddhist and former Minister of Defense, was chosen to form a new government.  Even without Hương to support his actions, the general did not hesitate in arresting communist agents, many of whom had disguised as monks in the Buddhist movement. His success in preventing Trí Quang from toppling the government led the Armed Forces Council (Hội Đồng Quân Lực) to name the general Uỷ Viên An-Ninh (Security Commissioner) in March, shortly after his friend Nguyễn Khánh was forced to resign and to leave the country.

Infuriated by the AFC's action, Trí Quang manipulated Quát, Thiệu and Kỳ into dismissing the general from his positions of military governor and Special Capital Military District Commander.  A recent declassified CIA memo showed Thiệu as the one who requested general "Little" Minh, the Chief of General Staff, to investigate Đổng for protecting gambling operations, a claim that Minh disputed and refused to do as asked.  The same memo showed Quát wanting to dismiss the general for being a troublemaker and Kỳ claiming Đổng as corrupted.  All of their actions against the general came after Trí Quang's continuous accusation that Đổng was pro Catholics and perhaps even pro Diệm.  The monk cited the general's unexplained actions toward some of Diệm's people as evidences, such as: protecting Lê Văn "White" Thái (Dr. Tuyến's assistant), or defending Trần Quốc Bửu (co-founder of the Cần Lao party) and Mã Tuyên (Head of the Triều Châu Chinese in Saigon).

For two years after the dismissal, Đổng remained in politics.  He stayed in touch with two friends who had been exiled by Kỳ: Nguyễn Chánh Thi who sided with the monks during the Buddhist Crisis in Central Vietnam and Nguyễn Khánh who was too vocal against American intervention in Vietnamese affairs.  During this period, he was sent to several special assignments abroad, most notably to Thailand where his friend and a former Diệm's supporter, general Thái Quang Hoàng was the Ambassador.  In June 1967, Kỳ forced the general to retire.

The retirement did not stop Đổng from military and social affairs.  He continued to keep in touch with ARVN general officers to learn of troops' morale and he mentored junior officers in tactics.  He also continued to serve armed forces personnel by co-founding an association for ancient and current combatants, the Hiệp Hội Chiến Sĩ Tự Do.
He worked with Australian Brigadier Ted Serong on a defense plan for the country in case the USA decided to stop all military aid.  Closer to home, he continued to train his private army of Nùng soldiers.

From the height of a political career to exile
From 1969 to 1974, General Đổng served military personnel in a different capacity, Minister of War Veterans (equivalent to the US Secretary of Veterans Affairs).  During this time, he worked with West Germany to get financial and medical support for disabled veterans.  His relationship with German officials in Oberhausen resulted in military orphans or children of disabled veterans going there to further their education. Most of the students came from the seven ministry-sponsored Quốc Gia Nghĩa Tử schools.  Minister Đổng's personal ties with Australian, Taiwanese and South Korean officials benefited Vietnamese veterans.  During his tenure, Australia, Taiwan and South Korea provided much needed funding and training to disabled veterans at vocational facilities.  His friendship with an American adviser Shelby Robert and his wife Miriam benefited the ministry as well. In April 1973, the Robert and the Gettysburg Presbyterian Church donated several wheelchairs and provided funding to train a Vietnamese doctor from the ministry.  Later that year, the minister traveled to the United States and several western European countries to ask for financial assistance.  The trip yielded good results: several US colleges provided the ministry with funding for its prosthetics center. In particular, Ohio State University sent professors to train teachers and to teach QGNT's students in three special courses: typing, accounting and home economics.

President Thiệu, in power since 1967, was becoming a dictator.  By 1974, he had had thousands opposition persons arrested, and had increased the number of executions. Mass protest demonstrations led by opposition leaders in Saigon caused Thiệu to reorganize his cabinet in an attempt to quiet the opposition.  He also used the occasion to get rid of potential threats to his power.  Minister Đổng, with his own private army and considered by Thiệu as a potential threat, was dismissed from the cabinet in February 1974 and two months later imprisoned without trial on corruption charges.  Government-run newspapers and television channels then launched a public humiliation campaign against the minister, accusing him of corruption and of plotting against the government.  In June, a special committee acquitted the minister of all charges after hearing testimonies from the ministry's high-ranking staff.  Still, Đổng was only released in July after Trần Quốc Bửu, head of the Tổng Liên Đoàn Lao Công (Confederation of Vietnamese Labor, the equivalent of the American AFL-CIO), and Father Hoàng Quỳnh of the Northern Catholics pressured Thiệu to do so.

After his release, General Đổng spent his time mentoring senior Army officers and advising civilian opposition leaders on tactics against President Thiệu.  The Communist invasion in 1975 cut short of his attempt to return to political power.

During the Fall of Saigon, he and his family were able to escape on a US Air Force C130 that took them to Guam, and then onward to the United States where he was offered political asylum.

Personal life
In his spare time, Đổng wrote poems to relax under the pen name of Nùng Khánh Lâm.  In 1944 while he was stationed in Móng Cái, he wrote poems to court a Nùng woman, Lê Thị Lý (1919–1992).  They got married and eventually had five children.  After coming to the United States and settling in Arlington County, Virginia, Đổng would occasionally serve as a translator on special projects for the Defense Department before retiring in 1982 to take care of his wife who had suffered from a stroke.

Two years after Lý died, Đổng remarried to Mỹ-Lan Trịnh, from whom he acquired three stepdaughters. In 1996, he and his new family moved to Philadelphia, Pennsylvania where he died of congestive heart failure on November 26, 2008.  Major General Phạm Văn Đổng is survived by his second wife Mỹ-Lan, five children, three stepchildren, nine grandchildren and three great-grandchildren.

Awards and decorations

General Đổng earned the following personal Vietnamese and foreign decorations and awards (unit citations are not listed):

Vietnam military decorations
 Tương Trung Long Tinh Huy-Chương (Officier de l'Ordre du Dragon d'Annam – Order of the Dragon of Annam, Officer class)
 Đệ Tam Đẳng Bảo Quốc Huân-Chương (Commander of the National Order)
 Chương Mỹ Bội Tinh Đệ Nhất hạng (Chuong My Merit medal, 1st class)
 Đệ Tứ Đẳng Bảo Quốc Huân-Chương (Officer of the National Order)
 Lục Quân Huân-Chương Đệ Nhất hạng (Army Distinguished Service Order, 1st class)
 Anh Dũng Bội Tinh (Cross of Gallantry, with 18 citations – palms & gold stars)
 Phát Triển Sắc Tộc Bội Tinh Đệ Nhất hạng (Ethnic Development Service Medal, 1st class)

Foreign decorations and awards
 Republic of China Order of Blue Sky and White Sun with Grand Cordon (青天白日勳章)
 Republic of China Order of Brilliant Star, 1st Class(一等景星勳章)
 France Chevalier de la Légion d'honneur
 France Croix de guerre 1939-1945 avec palme de bronze (citation a l'ordre de l'Armée)
 France Croix de guerre des Théatres d'Opérations Extérieures avec 2 palmes d'argent et 4 citations de bronze
 France Croix du combattant volontaire
 France Médaille Coloniale avec Barrette Extrême-Orient
 France Médaille d'honneur pour Actes de Courage et de Dévouement
 France Médaille Commémorative de la guerre 1939–1945
 France Médaille commémorative de la campagne d'Indochine
 France Chevalier de l'Ordre du mérite du Territoire Autonome Nung
 France Croix d'officier de l'Ordre du Mérite Civil de la Fédération T'ai
 Republic of Korea Field Marshal Lord Eulji Cordon, ROK 2nd highest decoration Order of Military Merit (무공훈장: 을지).
 Republic of Korea Order of Service Merit, 2nd Class (근정훈장: 황조)
 Kingdom of Thailand Most Exalted Order of the White Elephant, Commander class (๒๓. ตริตราภรณ์ช้างเผือก – dtrì dtaa pon cháang-pèuak)

Quotes

Quotes by 
 "Our (the Republic of Vietnam government's) failure even to try winning the active loyalty of the rural population would lead toward defeat" (to George Allen, a US Army intelligence analyst in May 1960)

Quotes about 
 "... his military skills, exceptional leadership and effort have contributed to the success (of the 55th BVN) at Nà Sản in 1952 ..." (Republic of Korea's Minister of Defense Son Won Il, August 1954)
 " ... a professional soldier ... tough, combatwise ... long friendship ... two old comrades from widely divergent backgrounds pulled together by the drama of Indochina." (Howard R. Simpson wrote about Dong and their friendship, Tiger in the Barbed Wire)
 "... considered extremely tough .... the outstanding field commander in the country ... (other leaders) feared he might lead a revolt ..." (David Halberstam wrote about Dong's abilities as reported by American military advisers, The Making of a Quagmire)
 "... As to likely candidates to replace (General Nguyen) Khanh (as Head-of-State), I can only mention a few who seem to us the best qualified ... General Pham Van Dong has handled himself very well in his sensitive assignment as CG (Commanding General), Capital Military District, and has the confidence of Prime Minister (Tran Van) Huong ... Huong knows only Dong and likes him ..." (Ambassador Maxwell Taylor's telegram to U.S. Secretary of State Dean Rusk, December 23, 1964)

References

Glossary
 1964–67 = This period of political unrest caused by Communist-manipulated, CIA-backed monks was also known as the "time of the generals".  During this time, senior officers often formed groups with their own armies either to stage a coup d'état or to protect themselves from their rivals.  Evidences can be seen in photographs or senior officers and their troops wearing non-regulated uniforms of various designs.
 Armée Nationale Vietnamienne (ANV) = Quân đội Quốc gia Việt Nam (National Army of Vietnam) created in 1949 as the State of Vietnam's armed forces.
 ARVN = Army of the Republic of Vietnam, often incorrectly used as a collective term to refer to all South Vietnamese armed forces.
 Bình Xuyên connection = General Đổng's belief in sheltering nationalists-in-danger led to his friendship with several former members of the Bay Vien's Bình Xuyên (officially part of the QDQGVN under Head-of-State Bảo Đại).  Lieutenant Lê Nhựt Quang, one of his earlier aides-de-camp, was the son of a Bình Xuyên member.
 Bùi Chu Secteur = located in Bùi Chu province and heavily populated by Catholics, the secteur was one of the first French military territories returned to the ANV's control.
 BVN = Bataillon Vietnamien.  Officially formed in 1949 as part of the Army for the State of Vietnam, a typical battalion consisted of 829 men, armed with French weapons. Its officers could be either Vietnamese or French. BVNs were formed to replace French units. By 1954, there were 98 BVN's.
 Bataillon Léger = Light Infantry Battalion or Tiểu-đoàn Khinh-quân, formed in 1953, consisted of 638 men, armed entirely with US weapons.  Its officers were Vietnamese. TDKQs were formed to pacify territories. By July, 1954, there were 81 TDKQ's.
 Corps = The Republic of Vietnam was divided into four tactical zones, each of which was a political as well as military jurisdiction.
 Duy Dân = Đại Việt Duy Dân (Great Viet Populism Party) founded in 1942 by Nguyen Huu Thanh, codename Ngoc Tho (White Jade Rabbit) or more commonly known as XYZ Thai Dich Ly Dong A. The party found its support among Northern Vietnamese intellectuals who saw Ly Dong A's Populism as one of the best Vietnamese political theories.  A wrote many doctrines and one of his best work is Huyet Hoa (Blood Flower). In 1946, after a failed armed revolt to overthrow Ho Chi Minh's government, A and his lieutenants were arrested and executed in Hòa Bình.  During the Vietnam War, Professor Nguyễn Hữu Chỉnh, one of Duy Dân's top theorists, was one of General Đổng's political advisers.
 Đỗ Hữu Vị school = One of the few schools the colonial government allowed to open for Vietnamese students in Tonkin.  It was named after the fifth son of Đỗ Hữu Phương, Chợ Lớn's honorary mayor. Captain Vị, crippled after his plane had crashed in a 1914 mission, rejoined his former unit the 1st Foreign Legion Regiment. On July 9, 1916, Captain Vị, commander of the regiment's 7th company, died while leading an attack on German troops near Chancelier.
 Field Division = Sư-đoàn Dã Chiến with 8,600 men was organized as a regular division for conventional warfare.
 Groupe Mobile = Largest military unit in Indochina and equivalent to a brigade or a light infantry division, a GM had approximately 6,000 men.  Besides the infantry troops, the unit had: 1 company of mortar and light artillery, 1 field battery battalion equipped with 105mm howitzers, 1 platoon of combat medics, 2 light armored companies and 2 amphibious forces.
 GS-2 = A group of officers in the headquarters of a military unit (in Đổng's case, a battalion) that provide their commanders with information for planning, coordinating, and supervising operations. In Military Staff Organization, "2" is the military intelligence group.
 Human Wave = Chiến Thuật Biển Người ("Sea of human" tactics) was a classic Communist offense used mostly by Chinese and Vietnamese from the 1940s to the 1980s.  An assaulting force that outnumbered defending troops at least 4 to 1 stormed the position continuously, creating endless "waves of people".  Heavy artillery pounding the position to rubble usually preceded the assault.
 Liên Khu Duyên Hải = Military territory comprising four coastal provinces: Phú Yên, Khánh Hòa, Ninh Thuận and Bình Thuận
 Light Infantry Division = Sư-đoàn Khinh Chiến with 5,245 men was organized to operate in difficult terrains.
 Nà Sản fire-support base = General Salan's brainchild against Giáp's forces assaulting the T'ai territory and Upper Laos.  Located in a valley 20 km south of Sơn La, the fortified fire-support base was a strategic point set up to cut off Viet Minh's troop movements and to defend northwest Tonkin.  Na-San had an airstrip that could accommodate the Dakota airplanes, had 21 "rings" of outposts with a complicated trench system, enforced with barbed wires. Na-San had a defense force of 11 battalions (15,000 men) and 6 artillery batteries.  In December 1952, Giáp's forces failed to capture Na-San after bloody battles that cost the Viet Minh close to 5,000 lives and 2,000 wounded prisoners.  The French Union forces lost 2 battalions.  In his autobiography, Salan credited the superior air-support for the French victory ("sans elle [l'aviation], Na San n'était pas possible et je perdais la bataille du Nord-Ouest" – "Without air-support, Nà Sản would not be possible and I would've lost the Northwest battle").
 Ninh Bình = A province south of the Red River Delta.  During the First Indochina War, Ninh Bình, a strategic position and the "rice basket of Tonkin", must be defended at all cost by the Franco-Vietnamese forces.
 Nùng = North Vietnam's ethnic minority of mixed Chinese-T'ai-Vietnamese.  They are Chinese-speaking but are classified separately from the urban ethnic Chinese or Hoa.  Their language is Cantonese Chinese with some T'ai and Vietnamese vocabularies.  Prior to the partition of Vietnam into two countries, the Nungs lived mainly in the northeast areas bordering China.  They are known for being a fierce warrior race.  For generations, they sided with the French colonial government in exchange for autonomy from the Vietnamese Imperial Court. During the Indochina and the Vietnam Wars, Nungs were on both sides of the conflicts.  General Phạm Văn Đổng, a northern Vietnamese who had gained their respect, was considered as one of their own. Đổng spoke the language fluently, accepted their customs and married a Nung from Móng Cái. The actual highest-ranking Nung in the ARVN was Major General Chướng Dzếnh Quay, IV Corps Chief of Staff at the end of the war.  On the communist side, Lieutenant General Lê Quang Đạo was the highest-ranking Nung known during the Indochina and Vietnam Wars.
 Quảng Yên Military Academy (NCO) = Established in 1953 as a military educational institution that prepared candidates for service in the State of Vietnam Army's non-commissioned officer corps.
 Quốc Gia Nghĩa Tử = Ward of the Nation was a brainchild of Lieutenant Colonel Trương Khuê  Quan who modeled it after France's National Office of Wards of the Nation. This independent agency was formed in October 1963 to provide educational opportunities for war orphans and children of war invalids/disabled veterans.  In 1967, the Ministry of War Veterans took over the agency but continued to let it run by an independent management committee.  By the end of the Vietnam War, QGNT had seven schools and 4 dormitories with over 200 teachers and an administrative staff close to 300 persons (most of whom were military widows, war disabled veterans and family members of soldiers who had died during the war).
 RMIC = Régiment Mixte d'Infanterie Coloniale (Mixed Colonial Infantry Regiment) consisted of 4 battalions.
 Territoire Militaire = Part of the Tonkin division that had 5 military territories, one of which was the 1er Territoire Militaire based in Móng Cái.
 Việt Cách = Việt Nam Cách Mạng Đồng Minh Hội (Vietnam Revolutionary Alliance Party) started out in Nanjing as a coalition force of Vietnamese revolutionaries living in China since the late 1930s. Its first governing body consisted of leaders from different parties.  By 1944, infighting rendered Việt Cách ineffective and most members went back to their original parties.  Those remained with the party rallied around Nguyễn Hải Thần.  After World War II, party members led by Than and armed by Kuomintang returned to Vietnam where several of its leaders joined Ho Chi Minh's government.  After Ho signed the modus vivendi allowing French troops to re-enter the country, Viet Minh attacked to eliminate all opposition groups (Viet Cach was one).  Some of the surviving members went back to China while others remained behind to rally around Bảo Đại.  During the Vietnam War, a Viet Cach leader of VNQDĐ's background Tạ Nguyên Hối was one of General Đổng's political advisers.
 Zône = The State of Vietnam was divided into several military zones.  In the early years of the country when the central government was new and when French colonial officials were still involved Vietnam's affairs, commanders (commandants) ran their zones any way they wanted to, some to the point of being warlords.  The zones in Tonkin were: Northwest Autonomy Zone, Zone North, Zone West, Zone South, Zone Hanoi, Zone Hai Phong and Coastal Zone.  Zone South (Zone Sud), the largest and most important, consisted of 3 provinces (Nam Định, Thái Bình and Ninh Bình), Phủ Lý capital town, 4 sectors and 2 quarters (north of south of Sông Đáy).

Bibliography

External links
News of his death:

General:

 

External Links on Medals:

, Retrieved September 30, 2009
, Retrieved November 8, 2009

Army of the Republic of Vietnam generals
1919 births
2008 deaths
Non-U.S. alumni of the Command and General Staff College
South Vietnamese military personnel of the Vietnam War
Vietnamese anti-communists
Vietnamese emigrants to the United States
3 Pham Van Dong
Recipients of the Gallantry Cross (Vietnam)
Recipients of the Distinguished Service Order (Vietnam)
Recipients of the Order of the Dragon of Annam
Chevaliers of the Légion d'honneur
Recipients of the Order of Blue Sky and White Sun
Recipients of the Croix de Guerre 1939–1945 (France)
Recipients of the Order of Military Merit (Korea)

Recipients of the Croix de guerre des théâtres d'opérations extérieures
People of the First Indochina War
People from Arlington County, Virginia
Military personnel from Philadelphia
Government ministers of Vietnam